Parliamentary elections were held in Nauru on 3 December 1983. As there were no political parties, all candidates ran as independents. Following the election, President Hammer DeRoburt was re-elected by ten votes to six.

Results

Aftermath
Following the elections, DeRoburt was re-elected president. He appointed long-term ally Buraro Detudamo as Minister for Works and Communications and Minister Assisting the President, and three former opponents to the other positions; Kenas Aroi as Minister for Finance, Bernard Dowiyogo as Minister for Justice and Lawrence Stephen as Minister for Education and Health.

References

Nauru
1983 in Nauru
Elections in Nauru
Non-partisan elections
Election and referendum articles with incomplete results